The 1984 FA Cup final was contested by Everton and Watford at Wembley. Everton won 2–0, with one goal by Graeme Sharp and a controversial goal from Andy Gray. He was adjudged by many to have fouled the Watford goalkeeper Steve Sherwood by heading the ball from Sherwood's hands. Everton had reached the final seven times previously, winning in 1906, 1933 and 1966. This was Watford's first FA Cup Final appearance.

With the exception of Andy Gray (who had been a Football League Cup winner earlier in his career with Aston Villa and then Wolverhampton Wanderers), this was the first major honour that any of the Everton players in this match had collected. It also ended Everton's 14-year wait for a trophy and was the first of eight honours they would win over the next four seasons. The period would prove to be the most successful spell in the club's history.

The closest Watford came to scoring was inside the first three minutes when John Barnes miscued a shot on the Everton goal, while Les Taylor's 25-yard shot went wide and Mo Johnston had a narrow miss with a header.

Match details

References

External links
FA Cup Finals Match Report
FA Cup Final Programme

1984
Final
Fa Cup Final 1984
Fa Cup Final 1984
FA Cup Final
FA Cup Final